Our Lady of Good Counsel High School, located in Sion, Mumbai, India is one of the oldest Catholic, coeducational schools in Mumbai. The school was founded as a primary school in 1939, and became a high school in 1958. Although run by the Archdiocese of Mumbai, a majority of students at the school have been non-Christians, chiefly Hindus. The school had a tradition of beginning each day with a spiritual value class, called Moral Science for non-Christians, and Religion for Christians.

The school is atop a hill, and shielded from the road by a massive black stone wall. The wall had two gates, one towards the East end and another to the West end. The west gate was used as the main entrance, with the east gate remaining closed most of the time. The rear boundary of the school is adjacent to a hillock which has a canon base and lookout. The base was built by the British. Students have to climb fifty steps each day, in five flights of ten steps each, to reach the main square where the church is located, before moving on to the assembly hall. Halfway up, on the side of the steps, is a white marble statue of the Virgin Mary, set inside a grotto, where a candle can be lit. Interesting school structures are the fifty steps, the grotto, the original two-storied school building, the small room in front of the church where classes first began 70 years ago and which served as the kindergarten classroom for many of today's grandfathers and grandmothers, the church itself and the black stone wall. 

Our Lady of Good Counsel High School's first headmaster was Mr.William Dias, whose younger brother, Father Sylvester Dias, served as  Principal. The duo served the school for nearly three decades. 

Students participate in the Boy Scout/Girl Guide and Red Cross movements. The school has an Interact movement (under the Rotary club) to spread social and community consciousness. 

The students of the school are divided among four houses - Roaring Lions(Red), Gigantic Elephants (Green), Brave Bulls (Blue) and Youthful Tigers (Yellow). The houses score points on the strength of their students' performance in sports, quizzes, academic, artistic, cultural and other extracurricular achievements. Earlier the four Houses were Bhabha (Yellow), Naidu (Red), Raman (Green) and Tagore (Blue) named after the well known Indian scientists and poets. School badges were issued to students in their respective House colours. The school excelled in basketball, especially in the girls division, and for long ranked among the top teams in the city.

Catholic secondary schools in India
Primary schools in India
Christian schools in Maharashtra
High schools and secondary schools in Mumbai
Educational institutions established in 1939
1939 establishments in India